Joseph-Étienne Letellier de Saint-Just (25 February 1880 – 7 July 1939) was a Liberal party member of the House of Commons of Canada. He was born in Saint-David-de-Lévis, Quebec and became a jeweller and an alderman and mayor of Lac-Mégantic, Quebec.

Letellier de Saint-Just attended Saint Jean Baptiste Academy at Lac-Mégantic, Quebec. Beginning in 1901, he was an official time inspector for the Quebec Central Railway and the Canadian Pacific Railway. He served as alderman and mayor of Lac Mégantic for nine years and was a director of the Board of Trade in that community.

He was first elected to Parliament at the Compton riding in the 1925 general election then re-elected in 1926. He was defeated by Samuel Gobeil of the Conservatives in the 1930 federal election.

References

External links
 

1880 births
1939 deaths
Letellier de St-Just family
Liberal Party of Canada MPs
Mayors of places in Quebec
Members of the House of Commons of Canada from Quebec
Canadian Pacific Railway people
People from Lévis, Quebec
People from Lac-Mégantic, Quebec